A sunspot is a dark region that periodically appears on the surface of the Sun.

Sun spot, Sunspot, or Sunspots may also refer to:

Art, entertainment, and media
 Sunspot (Marvel Comics), a Marvel Comics superhero
 "Sunspot", a song by Moby, B-side to the 1999 song "Bodyrock"
 "Sunspots" (song), a 1984 song by Julian Cope
 "Sunspots", a song by Modest Mouse from their 1997 EP The Fruit That Ate Itself
 "Sunspots", a song by Nine Inch Nails from the 2005 album With Teeth
 "Sunspots", an episode of Static Shock
 Sunspots (TV series), a 1974–75 Canadian television series

Science and technology
 Sunspot Solar Observatory, a solar telescope in Sunspot, New Mexico, unincorporated place, United States, and the site of the Richard B. Dunn Solar Telescope and visitors center
 Sun SPOT, a wireless sensor network device created by Sun Microsystems
 Sun spots or solar lentigo, skin blemishes
 Sunspot (Trojan horse), computer malware
 SunSpot, the codename for the multi-display ATI Eyefinity Technology

Other

 Sunspots (economics), the economic term referring to a random variable